Shahgai railway station is located in Shagai, Federally Administered Tribal Areas of Pakistan. It lies on the Khyber Safari line between Peshawar and Landi Kotal.

See also
 List of railway stations in Pakistan
 Pakistan Railways

References

External links

 andrewgrantham.co.uk - The Khyber pass railway
 thenews.pk - Article on railway connection featuring a Picture of the Shahgai station (web.archive.org)

Railway stations in Khyber District
Railway stations on Khyber Pass line